Alan Keane (born 23 September 1984) is a retired Irish footballer.

Keane is a versatile player who can play anywhere across the back four, though his preferred position is right back. He has also been known to play on the wing.

Career

Galway United
Keane made his début for Galway United towards the end of the 2005 season and was mostly was used as a right back in his time with the club.

Sligo Rovers
In February 2009, Keane joined Sligo Rovers after four seasons at Galway United.

Keane missed a penalty and scored an own goal in the 2009–10 UEFA Europa League tie against Albanian side Vllaznia. In the second leg he scored at the right end. He went on to become Rovers regular penalty taker during the 2010 season scoring some important goals including one in the last minute of the season against St. Patrick's Athletic to secure third place. He did however miss in the FAI Cup final shoot-out two weeks later.

He was an important part of the league winning Rovers team in 2012 although he missed the end of the season through injury. He only missed one game in the 2013 League of Ireland season and picked up his third FAI Cup winners' medal with the club following the win over Drogheda United in the final. He made his 200th appearance for Sligo in the game against St. Pats towards the end of the season.

In February 2016, he announced his retirement from professional football.

Dundalk
On 25 August 2016, Keane came  out of retirement and signed for Dundalk in the League of Ireland Premier Division citing the influence of manager Stephen Kenny as one of the reasons he was attracted to the club. He made his debut five days later in an FAI Cup Third Round win against Crumlin United.

Crusaders
On 7 January 2017, Keane joined Crusaders in Northern Ireland on a six-month loan spell.

Personal life
Following his retirement from football, Keane worked as a firefighter.

Honours
Sligo Rovers
League of Ireland (1): 2012
FAI Cup (3): 2010, 2011, 2013
League of Ireland Cup (1): 2010
Setanta Sports Cup (1): 2014

Dundalk
League of Ireland (1): 2016

Career statistics

Club 
Correct as of 7 November 2011.

References

External links

1984 births
Galway United F.C. (1937–2011) players
Sligo Rovers F.C. players
League of Ireland players
Republic of Ireland association footballers
Living people
Association footballers from County Galway
Mervue United A.F.C. players
Association football defenders
Crusaders F.C. players
Dundalk F.C. players